is a Japanese actress and model.

Filmography

Films
{| class="wikitable" style="font-size: 95%;"
!nowrap|Year!!style="width:7em;"|Release Date!!Title!!style="width:17em;"|Role
|-
|rowspan="1"|2002||November 9||||
|-
|rowspan="2"|2005||June 25||||
|-
|August 6||||
|-
|rowspan="2"|2006||March 11||||
|-
|March 25||||
|-
|rowspan="3"|2007||April 21||||
|-
|April 28||||
|-
|June 16||||
|-
|rowspan="2"|2008||March 1||The Golden Compass||Voice of Pantalaimon for the Japanese dubbed version
|-
|September 27||||
|-
|rowspan="5"|2009||post-production||||
|-
|post-production||||
|-
|April 24||||
|-
|May 15||{{Nihongo|Shodo Girls|書道ガールズ!!　わたしたちの甲子園|Shodō gāruzu! ! Watashi-tachi no kōshien}}||
|-
|June 5||Seaside Motel||Rui Ninomiya
|-
|2011||May 14||Shōjotachi no Rashinban||Rumi Kusuda
|-
|rowspan="2"|2012||June 23||Love Masao-kun ga Iku!||Mizuki Yoshino
|-
|September 29||Bungō: Sasayaka na Yokubō||Yūko Mizuki
|-
|rowspan="3"|2013||September 28||Why Don't You Play in Hell?||Yoshiko
|-
|December 7||Ask This of Rikyu||Osan
|-
|December 14||Bushi no Kondate||Sayo Imai
|-
|2014||February 8||Nishino Yukihiko no Koi to Bōken||Subaru
|-
|rowspan="2"|2015||June 20||Yakuza Apocalypse||Kyōko
|-
|June 27||Strayer's Chronicle||Saya
|-
|rowspan="2"|2016|| ||A Cappella||Kyoko Noma
|-
| ||The Old Capital||Yui
|-
|rowspan="1"|2017|| ||Miracles of the Namiya General Store||Akiko
|-
|rowspan="1"|2018|| ||Kazoku no Hanashi||
|-
|rowspan="3"|2019|| || Aiuta: Yakusoku no Nakuhito ||
|-
| || Ghost Master||Mana
|-
| || Black School Rules||
|-
|rowspan="2"|2020|| ||Labyrinth of Cinema||Kazumi Saitō
|-
| || Georama Boy, Panorama Girl||
|-
|}

Television

Photobooks
 12sai (Littele More, 28 June 2005) 
 14sai no Koibana (Shufunotomo, 23 March 2007) 
 Natural Pure (Kadokawa Media House, 12 June 2007) 
 Rico Days (Wani Books, 5 September 2012)

Video games
Prince of Persia (Elika in Japanese dub)

References

External links
Narumi Riko at Ken On Entertainment 
 

1992 births
Japanese child actresses
Japanese film actresses
Japanese television actresses
Japanese female models
Living people
People from Kawasaki, Kanagawa
Ken-On artists